Happy Eyeballs (also called Fast Fallback) is an algorithm published by the IETF that makes dual-stack applications (those that understand both IPv4 and IPv6) more responsive to users by attempting to connect using both IPv4 and IPv6 at the same time (preferring IPv6), thus minimizing common problems experienced by users with imperfect IPv6 connections or setups. The name "happy eyeballs" derives from the term "eyeball" to describe endpoints which represent human Internet end-users, as opposed to servers.

Happy Eyeballs is designed to address the problem that many IPv6 networks are unreachable from parts of the Internet, and applications trying to reach those networks will appear unresponsive, thus frustrating users. Happy Eyeballs solves this problem by determining which transport would be better used for a particular connection by trying them both in parallel. An application that uses a Happy Eyeballs algorithm checks both IPv4 and IPv6 connectivity (with a preference for IPv6) and uses the first connection that is returned. The addresses are often chosen from the DNS with a round-robin algorithm.

Implementations of Happy Eyeballs stacks exist in Google's Chrome web browser, Opera 12.10, Firefox version 13, OS X, cURL and OpenBSD.

Happy Eyeball testing was part of World IPv6 Day in 2011.

The Happy Eyeballs algorithm may be extended for choosing between types of transport protocols as well, such as TCP and SCTP, but development is still in an experimental phase.

See also
 IPv6 deployment

References

IPv6 transition technologies